Zainadine Abdula Chavango Júnior (born 24 June 1988) is a Mozambican professional footballer who plays as a centre back for Portuguese club Marítimo.

He spent most of his career in Portugal with rivals Nacional and Marítimo, making over 200 Primeira Liga appearances.

A full international with over 60 caps for Mozambique since 2008, he represented the country at the 2010 Africa Cup of Nations.

Club career
Born in Maputo, Zainadine Júnior began his career with local Desportivo Maputo and Liga Muçulmana de Maputo. In late 2009, he and compatriot Mexer trialled at Sporting CP, but only the latter ended up signing.

In August 2013, Zainadine Júnior finally got his move to Portugal's Primeira Liga, joining C.D. Nacional. He made his debut on 22 September in a 1–0 home win over Académica de Coimbra, in which he assisted the goal by Mario Rondón. In 20 appearances as the team from Funchal secured fifth place and UEFA Europa League qualification, he scored once on 8 December to secure a 2–2 draw in the Madeira derby away to C.S. Marítimo.

After playing the 2016 Chinese Super League with Tianjin Teda FC, Zainadine Júnior returned to Portugal's top flight on loan to Marítimo. The team ended the season in sixth and qualified for Europe, with him scoring the equaliser in a 3–1 home win over F.C. Arouca on 19 March; the goal was voted the league's best of the month.

In July 2017, Zainadine Júnior rescinded his contract with Tianjin to sign for Marítimo. Two years later, he signed a new deal to keep him with the Rubro-Verdes until 2022.

International career
Zainadine Júnior was called up to represent Mozambique at the 2010 Africa Cup of Nations, where he was unused in a group stage elimination in Angola.

He scored his one international goal on 8 September 2018 in a 2019 Africa Cup of Nations qualifier at home to Guinea-Bissau, opening a 2–2 draw.

International goals
Scores and results list Mozambique's goal tally first.

References

External links
 
 
 

1988 births
Living people
Mozambican footballers
Mozambique international footballers
Association football defenders
GD Maputo players
Liga Desportiva de Maputo players
C.D. Nacional players
Tianjin Jinmen Tiger F.C. players
C.S. Marítimo players
Primeira Liga players
Chinese Super League players
Mozambican expatriate footballers
Mozambican expatriate sportspeople in China
Mozambican expatriate sportspeople in Portugal
Expatriate footballers in China
Expatriate footballers in Portugal
Sportspeople from Maputo